Lee Jenkins may refer to:

 Lee Jenkins (footballer, born 1961), English footballer for Aston Villa, Port Vale and Birmingham City
 Lee Jenkins (footballer, born 1979), Welsh footballer for Swansea City, Kidderminster Harriers and Carmarthen Town